Petrophile anceps is a species of flowering plant in the family Proteaceae and is endemic to a restricted part of southwestern Western Australia. It is a shrub with sharply-pointed, linear leaves and oval heads of hairy yellow flowers.

Description

Taxonomy
Petrophile acicularis was first formally described in 1830 by Robert Brown in the Supplementum to his Prodromus Florae Novae Hollandiae et Insulae Van Diemen from material collected by William Baxter at King George's Sound. The specific epithet (anceps) means "double", referring to the panicle.

Distribution and habitat
This petrophile is restricted to the Stirling Range where it grows in heath and scrub.

Conservation status
Petrophile acicularis is classified as "not threatened" by the Western Australian Government Department of Parks and Wildlife.

References

anceps
Eudicots of Western Australia
Endemic flora of Western Australia
Plants described in 1830
Taxa named by Robert Brown (botanist, born 1773)